The National Championship of Chilean Rodeo (Campeonato Nacional de Rodeo chileno) is the highest-level rodeo competition in Chile.

Place: Medialuna de Rancagua
City: Rancagua
Riders with more titles: Juan Carlos Loaiza (9 titles), Ramón Cardemil (7 titles), Eduardo Tamayo (7 titles).

National champions of Chile

Statistics

Championships for riders 
9:
 Juan Carlos Loaiza (1987, 1988, 1994, 2000, 2001, 2002, 2007, 2012, 2014)
7:
 Ramón Cardemil (1962, 1963, 1965, 1967, 1968, 1973, 1981)
 Eduardo Tamayo (1977, 1994, 2000, 2002, 2007, 2012. 2014)
5:
 Ruperto Valderrama (1962, 1963, 1965, 1967, 1968)
4:
 Hugo Cardemil (1986, 1990, 1991, 1993)
3:
 René Urzúa (1952, 1953, 1957)
 Abelino Mora (1956, 1961, 1966)
 Ricardo de la Fuente (1972, 1979, 1980)
 Jesús Bustamante (1974, 1989, 1992)
 René Guzmán (1982, 1995, 1996)
 José Astaburuaga (1990, 1991, 1993)
2:
 Santiago Urrutia (1955, 1969)
 Miguel Lamoliatte (1961, 1966)
 Samuel Parot (1969, 1977)
 Pablo Quera (1970, 1975)
 Raúl Cáceres (1970, 1975)
 Manuel Fuentes (1973, 1981)
 Carlos Mondaca (1987, 1988)
 Vicente Yañez (1989, 1992)
 José Manuel Rey (1995, 1996)
 Claudio Hernández (2005, 2006)
 Rufino Hernández (2005, 2006)
 José Manuel Pozo (1998, 2016)
 José Tomás Meza (2009, 2016)
 Gustavo Valdebenito (2013, 2018)
 Cristóbal Cortina (2010, 2018)

Championships associations 

 Curicó 14 (1962, 1963, 1965, 1967, 1968, 1970, 1973, 1975, 1981, 1985, 1986, 1990, 1991, 1993)
 Valdivia 10 (1987, 1988, 1994, 2000, 2001, 2002, 2003, 2007, 2012, 2014)
 Osorno 7 (1959, 1972, 1977, 1978, 1979, 1980, 1997)
 Temuco 5 (1949, 1956, 1961, 1966, 1983)
 Rancagua 4 (1976, 1989, 1992, 2011)
 Talca 3 (1998, 2005, 2016)
 Parral 2 (1955, 1969)
 Chépica 2 (1952, 1953)
 Bío-Bío 2 (1996, 2006)
 Cordillera 2 (2009, 2010)
 Santiago 2 (2015, 2016)
 Malleco 2 (2018)
 San Clemente 1 (1950)
 Hospital 1 (1951)
 Rengo 1 (1954)
 Chimbarongo 1 (1957)
 Río Bueno 1 (1958)
 San Carlos 1 (1960)
 Los Ángeles 1 (1964)
 Puerto Octay 1 (1971)
 Graneros 1 (1974)
 Mulchén 1 (1982)
 Chillán 1 (1984)
 Melipilla 1 (1995)
 Valparaíso 1 (1999)
 Linares 1 (2004)
 Cautín 1 (2008)
 O'Higgins 1 (2011)
 Llanquihue and Palena 1 (2017)

Horse championships 

 Reservado (1990, 1991, 1993)
 Manicero (1962, 1965, 1968)
 Talento (2000, 2002, 2007)
 Aceitata (1961, 1966)
 Matucho (1962, 1965)
 Trampero (1968, 1973)
 Estribillo (1978, 1980)
 Rico Raco (1987, 1988)
 Papayero (1987, 1988)
 Lechón (1990, 1991)
 Pretal (1995, 1996)
 Canteado (1995, 1996)
 Compadre, 2 (2013, 2018).

External links 

 Rodeo Chileno

Rodeo in Chile